Costache Negri is a commune in Galați County, Western Moldavia, Romania with a population of 2,562 people. It is composed of a single village, Costache Negri, and is named after Costache Negri, an 1848 revolutionary, who had an estate in the village, which was previously named Mânjina.

The commune lies on the banks of the river Geru, at the southern edge of the Moldavian Plateau.

References

External links
 

Communes in Galați County
Localities in Western Moldavia